The 1962–63 Botola is the 7th season of the Moroccan Premier League. FAR Rabat are the holders of the title.

References

Morocco 1962–63

Botola seasons
Morocco
Botola